Hakan Aslantaş (born 26 August 1985 in Nürtingen, Germany) is a Turkish footballer who currently plays as a right back for Iğdır FK.

References

External links
 
 
 
 
 

1985 births
Living people
Turkish footballers
Süper Lig players
TFF First League players
TFF Second League players
Gençlerbirliği S.K. footballers
Malatyaspor footballers
Hacettepe S.K. footballers
Kayserispor footballers
Konyaspor footballers
Bursaspor footballers
Ankaraspor footballers
Kardemir Karabükspor footballers
Eskişehirspor footballers
Sakaryaspor footballers
German people of Turkish descent
Turkey youth international footballers
Association football defenders